Flavia Zanfra (born 7 May 1958 in Trieste) is an Italian sport shooter. She competed in rifle shooting events at the 1988 Summer Olympics.

Olympic results

References

1958 births
Living people
ISSF rifle shooters
Italian female sport shooters
Shooters at the 1988 Summer Olympics
Olympic shooters of Italy
Sportspeople from Trieste